The Saudi International, branded as the PIF Saudi International powered by SoftBank Investment Advisers for sponsorship reasons, is a professional golf tournament that is held at Royal Greens Golf & Country Club in King Abdullah Economic City, Saudi Arabia. Founded in 2019 as an event on the European Tour, in 2022, it became the flagship event on the Asian Tour with a new title sponsor, the Public Investment Fund (PIF), a Saudi government sovereign wealth fund.

History
Established in 2019 as a European Tour event, it was the first European Tour event to be played in Saudi Arabia and was one of six European Tour events staged in the countries on the Arabian Peninsula. The event has drawn criticism due to the involvement of Saudi Arabia's government in the event, based on their record of human rights within the country and their ventures of sportswashing. This included paying large appearance fees to some of the world's top players.

The tournament ceased to be a European Tour event after the 2021 edition, and later that year it was announced that as a result, the PGA Tour would not allow their members to compete in future editions, with the European Tour expected to do the same. In September 2021, it was announced that it would become part of the Asian Tour's schedule. In October, it was announced that the event would become the flagship event of the Asian Tour. In December, the PGA Tour revealed that they would grant their members releases to play in the event in 2022; on the condition that they committed to play in the AT&T Pebble Beach Pro-Am in some form in the following years.

In January 2022, it was announced that the Saudi Public Investment Fund had become the new title sponsor of the event.

Winners

Notes

References

External links

Coverage on the Asian Tour's official site
Coverage on the European Tour's official site

Asian Tour events
Former European Tour events
Golf tournaments in Saudi Arabia
Recurring sporting events established in 2019
2019 establishments in Saudi Arabia